The women's 5000 meter at the 2013 KNSB Dutch Single Distance Championships took place in Heerenveen at the Thialf ice skating rink on Sunday 11 November 2012. Although this tournament was held in 2012, it was part of the 2012–2013 speed skating season.

There were 14 participants. There was a qualification selection incentive for the next following 2012–13 ISU Speed Skating World Cup tournaments.

Title holder was Pien Keulstra.

Overview

Result

Draw

Source:

References

Single Distance Championships
2013 Single Distance
World